The England cricket team visited Ireland on 25 August 2011 for a single One Day International (ODI).

Squads

ODI Series

Only ODI

References

2011 in Irish cricket
2011
Ire
International cricket competitions in 2011